The 58th Rescue Squadron is one of five active-duty squadrons under the command of the 563d Rescue Group at Davis-Monthan Air Force Base, Arizona but located at Operating Site Alpha, Nellis Air Force Base, Nevada.

History

Rescue in North Africa
In the fall of 1952, Air Rescue Service, expanded its existing squadrons to groups.  Its 7th Air Rescue Squadron, which had responsibility for rescue support in an area stretching from the middle Atlantic and across North Africa to the Middle East, became the 7th Air Rescue Group.  Air Rescue Service formed new squadrons, which replaced existing flights of the old squadrons.  The 58th Air Rescue Squadron was activated at Wheelus Air Base, Libya, where it assumed the mission and took over the resources of Flight E, 6th Air Rescue Squadron.  

The 58th flew search and rescue in parts of the Middle East, Africa, and Southern Europe, especially at the El Uotia Gunnery Range in Libya.  It was briefly inactive from September 1960 until June 1961.  It also stood downrange alert during manned space missions, performed some overwater escort, and provided humanitarian aid during natural disasters.  In September 1969, a coup led by Muammar Gaddafi replaced the Kingdom of Libya with the Libyan Arab Republic. The new republic terminated American base rights in Libya and the squadron was inactivated.

Guardian Angel
Prior to about 2000, Air Force rescue units were frequently composite units (as shown by the number of fixed and rotary wing aircraft flown by the squadron at Wheelus).  At that time, rescue units were organized as fixed wing, helicopter, or pararescue units.  The squadron, now the 58th Rescue Squadron, was activated at Nellis Air Force Base, Nevada, in June 2002 as a pararescue squadron, often called a "Guardian Angel" squadron.  The squadron possesses no aircraft, but its rescue personnel fly on the helicopters of the 66th Rescue Squadron.

Lineage
 Constituted as the 58th Air Rescue Squadron on 17 October 1952
 Activated on 14 November 1952
 Discontinued on 18 September 1960
 Organized on 18 June 1961
 Redesignated 58th Aerospace Rescue and Recovery Squadron on 8 January 1966
 Inactivated on 15 February 1970
 Redesignated 58th Rescue Squadron on 30 May 2002
 Activated on 14 June 2002

Assignments
 7th Air Rescue Group, 14 November 1952 (attached for operational control to Headquarters United States Air Forces Europe (USAFE), until 15 November 1953, to Seventeenth Air Force until 1 August 1954, USAFE, until unknown date)
 12th Air Rescue Group, 8 December 1956
 Air Rescue Service, 18 Feb 1958 – 18 September 1960
 Air Rescue Service (later Aerospace Rescue and Recovery Service), 18 June 1961
 Atlantic Rescue and Recovery Center (later 40 Aerospace Rescue and Recovery Wing), 1 April 1967 – 15 February 1970
 57th Operations Group, 14 June 2002
 563d Rescue Group, 1 October 2003 – present)

Stations
 Wheelus Air Base, Libya, 14 November 1952 – 18 September 1960
 Wheelus Air Base, Libya, 18 June 1961 – 15 February 1970
 Nellis Air Force Base, Nevada, 14 June 2002 – present

Aircraft

 Sikorsky H-5 Dragonfly (1952–1953)
 Grumman SA-16 Albatross (later HU-16) (1952–1960, 1961-1968)
 Fairchild C-82 Packet (1952–1953)
 Douglas SC-47 Skytrain (1953–1956)
 Sikorsky H-19 (also SH-19 (later HH-19)) (1953–1960, 1961–1963)
 Douglas SC-54 Skymaster (later HC-54) (1957–1960, 1961–1964)
 Kaman HH-43 Huskie (1963–1970)
 Boeing KC-97 Stratofreighter (1964)
 Boeing HC-97 Stratofreighter (1964–1966, 1968)
 Lockheed HC-130 Hercules (1966–1967)
 Sikorsky HH-3 Jolly Green Giant (1968–1969)

See also
 History of Libya under Muammar Gaddafi

References

Notes

Bibliography

Military units and formations in Nevada
058